The Sentimentality of William Tavener is a short story by Willa Cather. It was first published in Library in May 1900.

Plot summary
William and Hester, live in McPherson County. William is wealthy because he is a successful farmer and Hester is well respected and manages the farm. William is very stingy to everyone but his wife buying whatever she wanted. Hester buys items that a frivolous for her kids because she knows William won't. Hester stands up against William which creates a difficult dynamic about spending money. One day, Hester manages to talk her husband into letting their children go to the circus after he remembers going to one; they realize they were both there but only found out just now, supposedly. This leads them to reminisce about their past in Virginia, which they haven't done for years, they were too concerned with budgeting their money and getting their work done using their children. William then goes to bed and when the children come home she gives them the money that he gave her for them to go to the circus and tells them to be careful on their way and not to wake their father going to bed. The children feel like they have lost an ally because Hester won't stand up to William anymore so they won't be able to get frivolous items anymore.

Characters
William Tavener
Hester Perkins, William's wife.
The Howley boys
Billy, one of William and Hester's children.
Ellen Scribner
Tap, Tom Smith's son, whom William hired to weed the corn so he could go to the circus as a child.

References

External links 
Full Text at the Willa Cather Archive

1900 short stories
Short stories by Willa Cather
Works originally published in Library (journal)